Lilford's wall lizard (Podarcis lilfordi) is a species of lizard in the family Lacertidae. The species is endemic to the Balearic Islands, Spain.

Its natural habitats are temperate Mediterranean-type shrubby vegetation, rocky areas, and rocky shores. Originally distributed throughout the Balearics, the introduction of alien species which started with the Romans has confined the species to the uninhabited islets around the major islands, on almost each of which a local subspecies has evolved. It is threatened by habitat loss.

Etymology
P. lilfordi is named in honour of Thomas Powys, 4th Baron Lilford, a British ornithologist who studied the fauna of the Balearics.

Description
Lilford's wall lizard grows to a maximum snout-to-vent length of  but adults are usually a little smaller than this. The tail is about 1.8 times as long as the body. It is a robust streamlined lizard with a short-head and rounded body with smooth, unkeeled scales. The dorsal surface is usually greenish or brownish but varies much between different island subpopulations. There is usually a pale dorso-lateral stripe and there may be several dark streaks or three dark lines running along the spine. The flanks may be slightly reticulated and the underside is white, cream or pinkish. The throat may be blotched with darker colour. Juveniles sometimes have a blue tail.

Geographic range
Lilford's wall lizard is native to the islands of Menorca and Mallorca in the Balearic Islands, the Cabrera Archipelago to the south of Mallorca, and the neighbouring rocky islets. However it has been extirpated from the two large islands and is now only present on the islets.

Habitat
P. lilfordi is found at low altitudes. It is a mainly ground-dwelling species and largely inhabits rocky areas and scrubland, although it is found in woodland on Cabrera.

Behaviour
Lilford's wall lizard is a relatively tame lizard and easy to approach. It mainly feeds on insects, spiders and other arthropods, snails and some vegetable matter. This includes flowers and fruits, nectar and pollen. Some plants endemic to the Balearic Islands depend on this lizard for pollination. Other plants known to be pollinated by it include the mastic tree Pistacia lentiscus, rock samphire Crithmum maritimum, wild leek Allium ampeloprasum, clustered carline thistle Carlina corymbosa and the sea daffodil Pancratium maritimum. It is opportunistic around birds' nests in the use of scraps of food that have been regurgitated by gulls for their chicks. It also sometimes moves to the vicinity of nests of the Eleonora's falcon (Falco eleonorae) and feeds on the remains of its prey and the flies that accumulate around the nesting site. It is sometimes cannibalistic, eating juveniles and the tails of other lizards of its own species.

Reproduction
Breeding takes place in the summer, and females may lay up to three clutches of one to four eggs with an average mass of 0.63 g, large for a lizard of this size.

Conservation status
The population of this lizard seems to be in decline. It was at one time very numerous on Menorca and Mallorca but is no longer found on either. This extirpation may have been caused by the proliferation of cats and by other introduced predators, possibly the false smooth snake (Macroprotodon cucullatus) and the weasel (Mustela nivalis). Its total area of occupancy on all the small islands on which it is now present is less than  so the IUCN lists it as being "Endangered".

Subspecies
There are twenty-seven recognized subspecies many of which are found on only a single island:
Podarcis lilfordi lilfordi  – Aire islet, off the southeastern coast of Menorca
Podarcis lilfordi addayae 
Podarcis lilfordi balearica 
Podarcis lilfordi brauni  – Colom islet, off Menorca
Podarcis lilfordi carbonerae  – Carbonera islet, off Menorca
Podarcis lilfordi codrellensis  – Binicondrell islet, off the southern coast of Menorca
Podarcis lilfordi colomi  – Colomer islet, off northeast Menorca
Podarcis lilfordi conejerae 
Podarcis lilfordi espongicola 
Podarcis lilfordi estelicola 
Podarcis lilfordi fahrae 
Podarcis lilfordi fenni  – Sanitja islet, off northern Menorca
Podarcis lilfordi gigliolii  – Dragonera islet, off north of Majorca
Podarcis lilfordi hartmanni 
Podarcis lilfordi hospitalis 
Podarcis lilfordi imperialensis 
Podarcis lilfordi isletasi 
Podarcis lilfordi jordansi 
Podarcis lilfordi kuligae 
Podarcis lilfordi nigerrima 
Podarcis lilfordi planae 
Podarcis lilfordi probae 
Podarcis lilfordi porrosicola  – Porros islet, north of Menorca
Podarcis lilfordi rodriquezi  – Ratas Island lizard – Formerly Ratas Island, in Mahón's harbour (Menorca). Extinct after island was demolished in harbour expansion.
Podarcis lilfordi sargantanae  – islets located by the north coast of Majorca (Sargantana, Ravells, Bledes and Tusqueta).
Podarcis lilfordi toronis 
Podarcis lilfordi xapaticola 

Nota bene: A trinomial authority in parentheses indicates that the subspecies was originally described in genus other than Podarcis.

References

Further reading
Boulenger GA (1887). Catalogue of the Lizards in the British Museum (Natural History). Second Edition. Volume III. Lacertidæ ... London: Trustees of the British Museum (Natural History). (Taylor and Francis, printers). xii + 575 pp. + Plates I-XL. (Lacerta muralis Var. lilfordii, p. 33).
Günther A (1874). "Description of a new European Species of Zootoca". Ann. Mag. Nat. Hist., Fourth Series 14: 158-159. (Zootoca lilfordi, new species).

Podarcis
Endemic fauna of the Balearic Islands
Lizards of Europe
Reptiles described in 1874
Taxa named by Albert Günther
Taxonomy articles created by Polbot